John Gelston Floyd (February 5, 1806 – October 5, 1881) was an American lawyer and politician who served three terms as a U.S. Representative from New York from 1839 to 1853, and from 1851 to 1853. He was a grandson of William Floyd.

Life and career
Floyd was born in Mastic near Moriches, Long Island, New York, the son of Phoebe (Gelston) and Nicoll Floyd. Floyd attended the common schools, and was graduated from Hamilton College, Clinton, New York, in 1824. He studied law, was admitted to the bar in 1825, and commenced practice in Utica, New York.

Early career 
He served as clerk and prosecuting attorney of Utica, New York from 1829 to 1833. He founded the Utica Democrat (later the Observer-Dispatch) in 1836. He was appointed judge of Suffolk County.

Congress 
Floyd was elected as a Democrat to the Twenty-sixth and Twenty-seventh Congresses (March 4, 1839 – March 3, 1843). He returned to Mastic, Long Island, about 1842. He was a member of the New York State Senate (1st D.) in 1848 and 1849.

Floyd was elected to the Thirty-second Congress (March 4, 1851 – March 3, 1853). He served as chairman of the Committee on Agriculture (Thirty-second Congress).

Later career and death 
He joined the Republican Party upon its formation in 1856. He retired from public life.

He died in Mastic, Long Island, New York on October 5, 1881. He was interred in the family cemetery.

Family 
John G. Floyd is a great-great-grandfather of Republican Governor, and 2020 Presidential candidate Bill Weld.

References

1806 births
1881 deaths
New York (state) state court judges
Democratic Party members of the New York State Assembly
Democratic Party New York (state) state senators
Hamilton College (New York) alumni
Democratic Party members of the United States House of Representatives from New York (state)
People from Mastic, New York
19th-century American politicians
19th-century American judges